Stephen Colbert's AmeriCone Dream is a Ben & Jerry's ice cream flavor inspired by Stephen Colbert, host of the CBS television show The Late Show, and the fictionalized version of him who served as host of The Colbert Report on Comedy Central. The ice cream was introduced in 2007. The same flavor became available in Canada as "Oh Cone-ada" in 2010.

Ice cream
AmeriCone Dream is vanilla ice cream with fudge-covered waffle cone pieces and a caramel swirl. Colbert is donating the proceeds from the sale of AmeriCone Dream to charity through The Stephen Colbert AmeriCone Dream Fund. The Fund will support charities of concern to Colbert, such as food and medical assistance for disadvantaged children, helping veterans and their families, and environmental causes. Identified by co-founder Ben Cohen as the most patriotic flavor that Ben & Jerry's has ever done, Colbert also says that the flavor is perfect for any federal holiday. The name "AmeriCone Dream" is a pun on the term American Dream.

History
On March 20, 2007, Willie Nelson appeared on The Colbert Report to settle a dispute provoked by Colbert over AmeriCone Dream and Nelson's Country Peach Cobbler flavor.

On September 13, 2010, the nonprofit organization VolunteerMatch challenged Colbert to an on-air "Ice Cream Taste-Off" between AmeriCone Dream and another Ben & Jerry's ice cream flavor, Berry Voluntary.

On March 3, 2011, Jimmy Fallon appeared on The Colbert Report to have a "duel" of their respective Ben & Jerry ice cream flavors. The skit also featured appearances by Jon Stewart of The Daily Show and Ben & Jerry founders Ben Cohen and Jerry Greenfield. The skit ended with Fallon and Colbert singing a duet in peace.

On February 2, 2012,  Colbert announced that AmeriCone Dream Ice Cream will be given away free at Ben and Jerry's Scoop Shops on February 14, 2012 from 5:00 p.m. through 8:00 p.m. as a promotion for the design of the new lid which features "Superpack," referring to the "Colbert Super PAC."

On February 15, 2012, Colbert appeared on Late Night with Jimmy Fallon in yet another ice cream competition skit written to advertise both flavors.

On September 22, 2013, AmeriCone Dream appeared in the Breaking Bad episode "Granite State."

On July 22, 2014, Daniel Radcliffe announced AmeriCone Dream as his favorite post-coital food.

On September 27, 2017, Colbert announced on the Late Show that he will pledge $1000 through his AmeriCone Dream Fund for every pubescent celebrity photo Instagrammed or Tweeted under #PuertoRicoRelief or #PuberMe hashtags.

On January 21, 2019, Colbert and his Late Show guest Rep. Alexandria Ocasio-Cortez ate AmeriCone Dream together after showing Ocasio-Cortez's Instagram post of her eating AmeriCone Dream ice cream at the end of a long and tiring day in Congress.

On July 18th, 2022, Colbert reported on a "scandal" in which an ice cream with the same flavor profile was being sold under the name "Oh Cone-ada" in Canadian stores. This news came despite the fact that Jimmy Fallon's flavor "The Tonight Dough avec Jimmy Fallon" remained in Canadian grocery store aisles with only the change of "with" to "avec." At the conclusion of the segment, Colbert challenged his fans to buy "Americone Dream," eat it in its entirety, and then mail the empty container to anyone in Canada. As part of the segment, Colbert also shared that his ice cream's profits go entirely to charity, having raised more than $4 million since its debut.

References

External links

Ben & Jerry's
Americone Dream
Flavors of ice cream
Products introduced in 2007